A Beautiful Noise is a jukebox musical based on the life and music of Neil Diamond.  It opened on Broadway at the Broadhurst Theatre on December 4, 2022. It grossed more than $1 million at the box office in the week leading up to its Broadway premiere.

Titled for Diamond's 1976 album of the same name, A Beautiful Noise was written by Anthony McCarten and produced by Ken Davenport and Bob Gaudio. The musical is structured around a series of therapy sessions during which Diamond reacts to his lyrics as they are read by his psychiatrist from a second-hand copy of The Complete Lyrics of Neil Diamond.  In a June 19, 2022 interview with  The Boston Globe McCarten said: “She opens the book, and all 60 years of his songwriting and all that exploration pours out into a majestic musical collage, and once unloosed from the book, the songs take on lives of their own."

Prior to its Broadway debut, A Beautiful Noise ran for four weeks at the Emerson Colonial Theatre in Boston. Diamond and his wife, Katie McNeil Diamond, attended the opening in Boston. They also attended the Broadway premiere, where Diamond led an unannounced sing-along of "Sweet Caroline."  

In Boston, Will Swenson portrayed Diamond (then);  Diamond (now) was played by Mark Jacoby. Robyn Hurder played Diamond's second wife, Marcia, and Linda Powell portrays The Doctor.   In September 2022 it was announced that Swenson, Jacoby, Hurder and Powell would reprise their roles in the Broadway production and the full Broadway cast was announced.  It included Jessie Fisher as Jaye Posner, Tom Alan Robbins as Bert Berns and Kieve Diamond, Bri Sudia as Ellie Greenwich and Rose Diamond, and Michael McCormick as Fred Colby and Tommy O’Rourke.

Cast and characters

Reception 
In Boston, reviews of A Beautiful Noise were positive, with Swenson  earning significant praise.  In The Boston Globe he was described as a "shining Diamond";  WBUR reported that the musical included "dynamic performances top to bottom" with the "swagger-filled Will Swenson as Diamond" and a "terrific ensemble  more than a dozen talented actors and singers."

Reviews of A Beautiful Noise on Broadway were mixed.  Elizabeth Vincentelli wrote in the New York Times that the musical  was both "timid" and an "ambitious, often rousing, occasionally heavy-handed biographical show".   She praised Swenson's performance but criticized the narrative framework and the overall depiction of Diamond as "morose." A positive review in the New York Daily News predicted that the show would be a "box-office hit". In Variety, A.D. Amorosi wrote:   "Ultimately, 'A Beautiful Noise' is victorious, but not without a few rough bumps along the way — much like the trajectory of Diamond’s life."  The headline of an AP review by Mark Kennedy in the Washington Post read "Broadway's Diamond show isn't so good, so good" while noting that Swenson was "insanely great in every number."  The review that appeared in Entertainment Weekly noted that "those going to A Beautiful Noise want to be entertained and entertained they will be."

References

External links

Biographical musicals
Neil Diamond